Baegamsan  is a mountain of Gyeongsangbuk-do, eastern South Korea. It has an elevation of 1,004 metres.

See also
List of mountains of Korea

References

Uljin County
Yeongyang County
Mountains of North Gyeongsang Province
Mountains of South Korea
One-thousanders of South Korea